Natural selection is the process by which individual organisms with favorable traits are more likely to survive and reproduce.

Natural Selection may also refer to:
 Natural Selection (manuscript), Charles Darwin's main work on evolution, on which he based his abstract On the Origin of Species

Film
 Teresa's Tattoo, a 1994 film also known as Natural Selection
 Natural Selection (2011 film), a 2011 American independent comedy/drama film
 Natural Selection (2016 film), a 2016 American drama film

Music

Artists
 Natural Selection (group), a music group, plus their self-titled album

Albums
 Natural Selection (Tunnels album), 1993 (with Percy Jones)
 Natural Selection (Fuel album), 2003
 Natural Selection (Sounds from the Ground album), 2003
 Natural Selection (Frank Gambale album), 2010
 Natural Selection (Hunters & Collectors album), 2003

Songs
 "Natural Selection" (song), a song by Unkle

Television
 "Natural Selection" (The Spectacular Spider-Man), a 2008 episode of The Spectacular Spider-Man
 "Natural Selection" (The Unit), an episode of The Unit

Video games
 Natural Selection (video game), a 2002 modification for the computer game Half-Life
 Natural Selection 2, a 2012 sequel for the 2002 computer game